ESPN International is a family of sportscasting and production networks around the world. It was begun in 1989, is operated by ESPN Inc. and owned by The Walt Disney Company.

Operating regions

Latin America

Spanish-speaking countries 
 ESPN North (Mexico, Central America and Dominican Republic) (2 feeds)
 ESPN South (South America) (4 feeds)
 ESPN2 North (Mexico, Central America and Dominican Republic) (2 feeds)
 ESPN2 South (South America) (4 feeds)
 ESPN3 North (Mexico, Central America and Dominican Republic)
 ESPN3 South (South America) (2 feeds)
 ESPN4 North (Central America and Dominican Republic)
 ESPN4 South (South America, except Argentina) (2 feeds)
 ESPN Extra North
 ESPN Extra South
 ESPN Premium (Argentina)

Brazil 

 ESPN
 ESPN2
 ESPN3
 ESPN4
 ESPN Extra

Caribbean 

 ESPN
 ESPN2

Netherlands 

 ESPN
 ESPN2
 ESPN3
 ESPN4
 ESPN Ultra HD

Oceania 

 
 ESPN
 ESPN2

Sub-Saharan Africa 

 
 ESPN
 ESPN2

Japan 

 J Sports (1, 2, 3 & 4 – in joint-venture with J:COM, SKY Perfect JSAT and TBS)

Canada

ESPN International does not directly operate its own channels in Canada, but owns a 20 percent voting interest (and slightly larger equity interest) in CTV Specialty Television, a subsidiary of the Canadian media company Bell Media. Canadian regulations on the foreign ownership of broadcasters prohibit ESPN from acquiring majority interest.

CTV Specialty Television in turn operates the following sports television channels:
 The Sports Network (TSN) – five feeds
 Réseau des sports (RDS) – two feeds
 RDS Info 
 ESPN Classic

Although these channels have mainly retained their local brands (ESPN having acquired part-ownership several years after TSN and RDS launched), they now mostly have ESPN-style logos and use other ESPN branding elements. TSN has also adopted the SportsCentre title for its sports highlights programs.

Through CTV Specialty, ESPN also has an indirect interest in Discovery Channel Canada and several related channels, which are operated in partnership with Discovery Communications. These holdings date to CTV Specialty's previous incarnations as Labatt Communications and later as NetStar Communications, in which ESPN also held a minority interest. ESPN is not believed to have any involvement with the Discovery operations.

ESPN is also indirectly associated with TSN Radio, a brand used by several sports radio stations (each wholly owned by Bell Media), each of which also carries a limited amount of ESPN Radio programming.

Former operations

Asia-Pacific
In June 2012, News Corporation announced it would acquire ESPN's 50% stake in its joint venture ESPN Star Sports. Following the takeover, ESPN in Hong Kong, Taiwan and Southeast Asia was relaunched as Fox Sports in January 2013, while a version for Mainland China became Star Sports 2 in January 2014. Meanwhile, Star India acquired ESPN Software India from ESPN Star Sports, but kept ESPN brand for a while. ESPN International later established a partnership with what is now Sony Pictures Networks India in October 2015, and relaunched Sony Kix as Sony ESPN in January 2016. Sony ESPN was shut down in March 2020.

 ESPN Asia
 ESPN China
 Star Sports Asia
 Star Sports East Asia
 Star Sports India

Europe and MENA
 ESPN America
 ESPN Classic

Indian subcontinent
Sony ESPN
Sony ESPN HD

Philippines
ESPN5
5Plus

United Kingdom

ESPN launched ESPN Classic in 2006. The company bought the North American Sports Network (NASN) in 2007, and renamed it ESPN America in 2009. Also in 2009, it launched the domestic network ESPN UK after securing rights to the Premier League.

In February 2013, BT Group acquired ESPN's UK and Ireland television channel and remaining broadcasting contracts. Its domestic channel was re-branded as BT Sport ESPN, integrating it with the company's BT Sport channel group. In January 2015, BT Sport and ESPN reached a seven-year agreement to continue licensing ESPN's brand for the channel, as well as British rights to ESPN original programming and events whose international rights were owned by ESPN International. The agreement also allowed for joint digital media initiatives between the two companies. The agreement ended on August 1, 2022 after Warner Bros. Discovery acquired 50% stake in BT Sport from BT Group with agreeing to distribute Warner Bros. Discovery's factual streaming service Discovery+ in the United Kingdom and Ireland.

 BT Sport ESPN
 ESPN America
 ESPN Classic

See also 
List of ESPN Latin America announcers

References

External links 
ESPN International home page
ESPN (Latin America)
ESPN (Brazil)
ESPN (Caribbean)
ESPN (Netherlands)
ESPN (Oceania)
ESPN (Sub-Saharan Africa)
TSN (Canada)
RDS (Canada)
ESPN (Indian Subcontinent)
ESPN (Southeast Asia)
J Sports (Japan)
ESPN (UK and Ireland)
ESPN (Philippines)
ESPN (Singapore)
ESPN QQ (China)
ESPN Player

International
Disney television networks
Television channels and stations established in 1989
Television channels and stations established in 1995